The Anandpur Sahib Resolution was a statement with a list of demands made by the Punjabi Sikh political party, the Shiromani Akali Dal, in 1973.

Presentation in 1973
After the tenure of chief minister Gurnam Singh in the Punjab, newly demarcated in 1966, the Shiromani Akali Dal, were able to capture only one seat at the elections to Indian parliament in 1971 from Punjab's 13 seats. In the Punjab Assembly, following the March 1972 Punjab election, their tally was reduced to 24 seats out of 117, and the Punjab Government passed into the hands of the Congress Party, with Giani Zail Singh as chief minister.

Following this defeat, the Akali Dal appointed a sub-committee on 11 December 1972, to reflect upon the situation and to reiterate and clarify the party platform. The 12-member committee consisted of Surjit Singh Barnala, Gurcharan Singh Tohra, Jiwan Singh Umranangal, Gurmeet Singh, Dr. Bhagat Singh, Balwant Singh, Gian Singh Rarewala, Amar Singh Ambalavi, Prem Singh Lalpura, Jaswinder Singh Brar, Bhag Singh, and Major General Gurbakhsh Singh of Badhani. The first meeting of the sub-committee took place at Amritsar. The venue then shifted to Chandigarh where the committee completed its task in ten successive meetings. Counsel was available to the sub-committee of Sirdar Kapur Singh, whose impress was carried by the draft emerging from its deliberations. The document was adopted unanimously by the working committee of the Shiromani Akali Dal at a meeting held at Anandpur Sahib on 16–17 October 1973 and came to be known as the Anandpur Sahib Resolution. It was endorsed in the form of a succession of resolutions at the 18th All India Akali Conference of the Shiromani Akali Dal at Ludhiana on 28–29 October 1978.

The resolution included both religious and political issues. It asked for recognising Sikhism as a religion separate from Hinduism. It also demanded that power be generally devoluted from the Central to state governments, and more autonomy to Punjab.

1980s 

The resolution declaring its goals  which would make the state, of a quasi independent status, left only the powers of Foreign Relations, Defense, Currency and 
General Communications subject to the jurisdiction of the central government. Indira Gandhi, the leader of the Akali Dal's rival Congress, viewed the Anandpur Sahib Resolution as a secessionist document.

The document reached prominence in the 1980s when the Akali Dal and Jarnail Singh Bhindranwale joined hands to launch the Dharam Yudh Morcha in 1982 in order to implement the Anandpur Sahib Resolution. Thousands of people joined the movement, feeling that it represented a real solution to demands such as a larger share of water for irrigation and the return of Chandigarh to Punjab.

The Akali Dal officially stated that the Anandpur Sahib Resolution did not envisage an autonomous Sikh State of Khalistan. Its president Harchand Singh Longowal declared:

After the Operation Bluestar, Rajiv Gandhi reached a compromise with Longowal called Rajiv-Longowal Accord, on 24 July 1985. The government accepted the demands of Akali Dal who in turn agreed to withdraw their agitation. The accord attracted opposition from several orthodox Sikh leaders of Punjab as well as from the politicians of Haryana. Some of its promises could not be fulfilled due to the disagreements. Harchand Singh Longowal was assassinated by the Sikh militants opposed to the accord.

Purpose 
The Shiromani Akali Dal shall ever strive to achieve the following aims:

1. Propagation of Sikhism, its ethical values and code of conduct to combat atheism.

2. Preservation and keeping alive the concept of distinct and sovereign identity of the Panth and building up of appropriate condition in which the national sentiments and aspirations of the Sikh Panth will find full expression, satisfaction and facilities for growth.

3. Eradication of poverty and starvation through increased production and more equitable distribution of wealth and also the establishment of a just social order sans exploitation of any kind.

4. Vacation of discrimination on the basis of caste, creed or any other ground in keeping with basic principles of Sikhism.

5. Removal of disease and ill health, checking the use of intoxicants and provision of full facilities for the growth of physical well-being so as to prepare and enthuse the Sikh Nation for the national defence. For the achievement of the aforesaid purposes, the Shiromani Akali Dal owed society as its primary duty to inculcate among the Sikh; religious fervour and a sense of pride in their great socio-spiritual heritage through the following measures:

(a). Reiteration of the concept of unity of God, meditation on His Name, recitation of gurbani, inculcation of faith in the Holy Sikh Gurus as well as in Guru Granth Sahib Ji and other appropriate measures for such a purpose.

(b). Grooming at the Sikh Missionary College the Sikh youth with inherent potential to become accomplished preachers, ragis, dhadis and poets so that the propagation of Sikhism, its tenets and traditions and its basic religious values could be taken up more effectively and vigorously.

(c). Baptising the Sikhs on a mass scale with particular emphasis on schools and colleges wherein the teachers as well as the taught shall be enthused through regular study circles.

(d). Revival of the religious institution of Dasvandh among the Sikhs.

(e). Generating a feeling of respect for Sikh intellectuals including writers and preachers, who also would be enthused to improve upon their accomplishments.

(f). Streamlining the administration of the gurdwaras by giving better training to their workers. Appropriate steps would also be taken to maintain gurdwara building in proper condition. The representatives of the party in the Shiromani Gurdwara Prabandhak Committee would be directed to focus their resources towards these ends.

(g). Making suitable arrangements for error free publications of gurbani, promoting research in the ancient and modern Sikh history, translating holy gurbani into other languages and producing first-rate literature on Sikhism.

(h). Taking appropriate measures for the enactment of an All India Gurdwaras Act with a view to improving the administration of the gurdwaras throughout the country and to reintegrate the traditional preaching sects of Sikhism like Udasis and Nirmalas, without in any way encroaching upon the properties of their maths.

(i). Taking necessary steps to bring the Sikh gurdwaras all over the world under a single system of administration with a view to running them according to the basic Sikh forms and to pool their resources for the propagation of Sikhism on a wider and more impressive scale.

(j). Striving to free access to all those holy Sikh shrines, including Nanakana Sahib, from which the Sikh Panth has been separated, for their pilgrimage and proper upkeep.

(k). Development of the farmers (kisan) of Punjab.

Resolution

Resolutions adopted, in the light of the Anandpur Sahib Resolution, at open session of the 18th All India Akali Conference held at Ludhiana on 28–29 October 1978, under the presidency of Jathedar Jagdev Singh Talwandi are as under:

Resolution No. 1

Moved by Sardar Gurcharan Singh Tohra, president, Shiromani Gurdwara Parbandhak Committee.

The Shiromani Akali Dal realizes that India is a union and republican geographical entity of different languages, religions and cultures. To safeguard the fundamental rights of the religious and linguistic minorities, to fulfill the demands of the democratic traditions and to pave the way for economic progress, it has become imperative that the Indian constitutional infrastructure should be given a real federal shape by redefining the Central and State relation and rights on the lines of the aforesaid principles and objectives.
The concept of total revolution given by Lok Naik Jaya Parkash Narain is also based upon the progressive decentralization of powers. The climax of the process of centralization of powers of the states through repeated amendments of the Constitution during the Congress regime came before the countrymen in the form of the Emergency (1975), when all fundamental rights of all citizens was usurped. It was then that the programme of decentralization of powers ever advocated by Shiromani Akali Dal was openly accepted and adopted by other political parties including Janata Party, C.P.I. (M), D.M.K., etc.
Shiromani Akali Dal has ever stood firm on this principle and that is why after a very careful consideration it unanimously adopted a resolution to this effect first at the All India Akali Conference, Batala, then at Anandpur Sahib which has endorsed the principle of State autonomy in keeping with the concept of federalism.

As such, the Shiromani Akali Dal emphatically urges upon the Janata Government to take cognizance of the different linguistic and cultural sections, religious minorities as also the voice of millions of people and recast the constitutional structure of the country on real and meaningful federal principles to obviate the possibility of any danger to the unity and integrity of the country and, further, to enable the states to play a useful role for the progress and prosperity of the Indian people in their respective areas by a meaningful exercise of their powers.

Resolution No. 2

This momentous meeting of the Shiromani Akali Dal calls upon the Government of India to examine carefully the long tale of the excesses, wrongs, illegal actions committed [against the Sikhs] by the previous Congress Government, more particularly during the Emergency, and try to find an early solution to the following problems:

(a) Chandigarh originally raised as a Capital for Punjab should be handed over to Punjab.

(b) The long-standing demand of the Shiromani Akali Dal for the merger in Punjab of the Punjabi-speaking areas, to be identified by linguistic experts with village as a unit, should be conceded.

(c) The control of headworks should continue to be vested in Punjab and, if need be, the Reorganization Act should be amended.

(d) The arbitrary and unjust Award given by Mrs. Indira Gandhi during the Emergency on the distributions of Ravi-Beas waters should be revised on the universally accepted norms and principles, and justice be done to Punjab.

(e) Keeping in view the special aptitude and martial qualities of the Sikhs, the present ratio of their strength in the Army should be maintained.

(f) The excesses being committed on the settlers in the Tarai region of the Uttar Pradesh in the name of Land Reforms should be vacated by making suitable amendments in the ceiling law on the Central guidelines.

Resolution No. 3
(Economic Policy Resolution)

The chief sources of inspiration of the economic policies and programme of the Shiromani Akali Dal are the secular, democratic and socialistic concepts of Guru Nanak and Guru Gobind Singh. Our economic programme is based on three principles:

   (a) Dignity of labor.
   (b) An economic and social structure which provides for the uplift of the poor and depressed sections of society.
   (c) Unabated opposition to concentration of economic and political power in the hands of the capitalists.

While drafting its economic policies and programme, the Shiromani Akali Dal in its historic Anandpur Sahib Resolution has laid particular stress on the need to break the monopolistic hold of the capitalists foisted on the Indian economy by 30 years of Congress rule in India. This capitalist hold enabled the Central government to assume all powers in its hands after the manner of Mughal imperialism. This was bound to thwart the economic progress of the states and injure the social and economic interests of the people. The Shiromani Akali Dal once again reiterates the Sikh way of life by resolving to fulfil the holy words of Guru Nanak Dev:
"He alone realizes the true path who labors honestly and shares with others the fruits of that labor."

This way of life is based upon three basic principles:
   i. Doing honest labor,
   ii. Sharing with others the fruits of this labor, and
   iii. Meditation on the Lord's Name.

The Shiromani Akali Dal calls upon the Central and the State governments to eradicate unemployment during the next ten years. While pursuing this aim, special emphasis should be laid on amelioration the lot of the weaker sections, scheduled and depressed classes, workers, landless and poor farmers and urban poor farmers and urban poor. Minimum wages must be fixed for all of them.

The Shiromani Akali Dal urges Punjab government to draw up such an economic plan for the state as would turn it into the leading state during the next ten years by raising per capita income to Rs. 3,000 and by generating an economic growth rate of 7% per annum as against 4% at the national level.
The Shiromani Akali Dal gives first priority to the redrafting of the taxation structure in such a way that the burden of taxation is shifted from the poor to the richer classes and an equitable distribution of national income ensured.
The main plank of the economic programme of the Shiromani Akali Dal is to enable the economically weaker sections of the society to share the fruits of national income.

The Shiromani Akali Dal calls upon the Central government to make an international airport at Amritsar which should also enjoy the facilities of a dry port. Similarly, a Stock Exchange should be opened at Ludhiana to accelerate the process of industrialization and economic growth in the State. The Shiromani Akali Dal also desires that suitable amendments should be made in the Foreign Exchange rules for free exchange of foreign currencies and thereby removing the difficulties being faced by the Indian emigrants.
The Shiromani Akali Dal emphatically urges upon the Indian government to bring about parity between the prices of the agricultural produce and that of the industrial raw materials so that the discrimination against such states that lack these materials may be removed.
The Shiromani Akali Dal demands that the exploitation of the produces of cash crops like cotton, sugarcane, oil seeds, etc., at the hand of traders should be stopped forthwith and for this purpose arrangements be made for purchase by government of these crops at remunerable prices. Besides, effective steps should be taken by government for the purchase of cotton through the Cotton Corporation.
The Shiromani Akali Dal strongly feels that the most pressing national problem is the need to ameliorate the lot of millions of exploited persons belonging to the scheduled classes. For such a purpose the Shiromani Akali Dal calls upon the Central and State governments to earmark special funds. Besides, the state governments should allot sufficient funds in their respective budgets for giving free residential plots both in the urban and rural areas to the Scheduled Castes.

The Shiromani Akali Dal also calls for the rapid diversification of farming. The shortcomings in the Land Reforms Laws should be removed, rapid industrialization of the State ensured, credit facilities for the medium industries expanded and unemployment allowance given to those who are unemployed. For remunerative farming, perceptible reduction should be made in the prices of farm machinery like tractors, tubewells, as also of the inputs.

Resolution No. 4

This huge gathering of the Shiromani Akali Dal regrets the discrimination to which the Punjabi language is being subjected in adjoining States of Himachal, Haryana, Jammu and Kashmir, Delhi, etc. It is its firm demand that in accordance with the Nehru Language Formula, the neighboring states of Punjab should give "second" language status to Punjabi because of fairly large sections of their respective populations are Punjabi-speaking.

Resolution No. 5

The meeting regrets that against the "claims" of the refugees who had migrated to Jammu and Kashmir as a result of the partition of the country, no compensation had been provided to them even after such a long time and these unfortunate refugees had been rotting in the camps ever since then.
This Akali Dal session, therefore, forcefully demands that their claims should be settled soon and immediate steps should be taken to rehabilitate them even if it involves an amendment to section 370 of the Constitution.

Resolution No. 6

The 18th session of the All India Akali Conference take strong exception to the discrimination to which the minorities in other states are being subjected and the way in which their interests are being ignored.
As such, it demands that injustice against the Sikhs in other states should be vacated and proper representation should be given them in government service, local bodies and state legislatures, through nominations, if need be.

Resolution No. 7

The 18th session of the All India Akali Conference notes with satisfaction that mechanization of farming in the country has led to increase in the farm yield and as a result the country is heading toward self-sufficiency in foodgrain.
However, the session feels that poor farmers are unable to tale to mechanization because of the enormity of the cost involved.
As such, the Shiromani Akali Dal urges upon the Government of India to abolish the excise duty on tractors, so that with the decrease in their prices, the smaller farmers may also be able to avail themselves of farm machinery and contribute to increase in agricultural produce of the country.

Resolution No. 8

This conference of the Shiromani Akali Dal appeals to the Central and State governments to pay particular attention to the poor and laboring classes and demands that besides making suitable amendments in the Minimum Wages Act, suitable legal steps be taken to improve the economic lot of the laboring class, to enable it to lead respectable life and play a useful role in the rapid industrialization of the country.

Resolution No. 9

This session seeks permission from the Government of India to install a broadcasting station at the Golden Temple, Amritsar, for the relay of Gurbani Kirtan for the spiritual satisfaction of those Sikh who are living in foreign lands.
The session wishes to make it clear that the entire cost of the proposed broadcasting project would be borne by the Khalsa Panth and its overall control shall vest with the Indian Government. It is hoped that the Government would have no hesitation in conceding this demand after due consideration.

Resolution No. 10

This mammoth gathering of the Shiromani Akali Dal strongly urges upon the Government of India to make necessary amendments in the following enactment for the benefit of the agricultural classes who have toiled hard for the sake of larger national interests:
1. Hindu Succession Act be suitably amended to enable a woman to get rights of inheritance in the properties of her father-in-law instead of the father's.
2. The agricultural lands of the farmers should be completely exempted from the Wealth Tax and the Estate Tax.

Resolution No. 11

This vast gathering of the Shiromani Akali Dal strongly impresses upon the Government of India that keeping in vies that economic backwardness of the scheduled and non-scheduled castes, provisions proportionate to their population should be made in the budget for utilization for their welfare. A special ministry should be created at the centre as a practical measure to render justice to them on the basis of reservations.
The session also calls upon the government that in keeping with the settlement already made, no discrimination should be made between the Sikh and Hindu Harijans in any part of the country.

Resolution No. 12

The Congress government is called upon to vacate the gross injustice, discrimination done to Punjab in the distribution of Ravi-Beas waters. The Central government must also give approval for the immediate establishment of six sugar and four textile mills in Punjab so that the State may be able to implement its agro-industrial policy.

See also
 Chief Ministers of Punjab (India)
 Kharku

References 
 The Encyclopedia of Sikhism, Vol. 1, 1995, ed., Harbans Singh, page 133-141

Further reading 
 Gurmit Singh, History of Sikh Struggles, vol. I. Delhi, 1989
 Gopal Singh, A History of the Sikh People. Delhi, 1979

Sikh politics
History of Sikhism
Resolutions (law)
Insurgency in Punjab
1973 in India